Giulio Pinali (2 April 1997) is an Italian volleyball player who won 2021 European Championship.

Sporting achievements

Clubs
 FIVB Club World Championship
  Betim 2021 – with Itas Trentino

References

External links
 
 Player profile at Volleybox

1997 births
Living people
Italian men's volleyball players
Sportspeople from Bologna
Universiade medalists in volleyball
Universiade gold medalists for Italy
Medalists at the 2019 Summer Universiade